The 2022–23 Swiss Challenge League (referred to as the Dieci Challenge League for sponsoring reasons) is the 125th season of the second tier of competitive football in Switzerland and the 20th season under its current name.

Overview
Ten teams will compete in the league: eight teams of the previous season will participate in the league again. They are joined by FC Lausanne-Sport, the last-placed team of the 2021–22 Swiss Super League, who replace previous seasons champions FC Winterthur. Last season's last-placed team SC Kriens were relegated and are replaced by AC Bellinzona, who were promoted from the 2021-22 Swiss Promotion League. FC Schaffhausen, the losers of the 2021-22 relegation/promotion playoff, rejoined the league.

Due to the format change and increased number of teams in the 2023–24 Swiss Super League, this season will function as a transition season. As a result, the top two teams will be directly promoted and no teams will be relegated at the end of the season. Furthermore, the third-placed team will play a promotion playoff against the last placed team of the 2022–23 Swiss Super League, so a total of three teams may gain promotion to the Super League. Two teams of the 2022–23 Swiss Promotion League will be promoted and the third will play a relegation playoff with the last-placed Challenge League team.

Schedule
The schedule was announced on 17 June 2022. The first matchday will start on Friday 15 July 2022. 

Unlike the Super League, the Challenge League will not start the winter break early due to the 2022 FIFA World Cup, which will be held in November and December 2022. As such, the 18th matchday will clash with matches of the World Cup. Restart of the league after the winter break will begin on 27 January 2023 and the season will conclude on the 27 May 2023. Relegation and promotion play-offs will be held in the following week.

Participating teams

Stadia and locations

Personnel and kits

Managerial changes

League table

Results

First and second rounds

Third and fourth rounds

Play-offs

Promotion play-off

Relegation play-off
The relegation/promotion play-off will be played in a two-legged game between the last placed team of the Challenge League and the third placed team of the Promotion League. These games will be played in the week following the final matchday (27 May 2023).

Awards

References

External links
 
 Soccerway

Swiss Challenge League
2022–23 in Swiss football
Swiss Challenge League seasons
Current association football seasons